Mutsuo Taniguchi (5 March 1913 – 2 October 1943) was a Japanese sprinter. He competed in the men's 200 metres and the men's 4 x 100 meters relay events at the 1936 Summer Olympics. He was killed in action during World War II.

References

1913 births
1943 deaths
Japanese male sprinters
Olympic male sprinters
Olympic athletes of Japan
Athletes (track and field) at the 1936 Summer Olympics
Japan Championships in Athletics winners
Japanese military personnel killed in World War II
People from Yatsushiro, Kumamoto
Sportspeople from Kumamoto Prefecture
20th-century Japanese people